The Guardian of Isis is a young adult novel by Monica Hughes, and is the sequel to The Keeper of the Isis Light. The story takes place on the fictional world of Isis.  It is set 55 years after the first book, and now two more generations have been born.

Plot summary 

Mark London is now president of the settlement.  He has forced the people to abandon all technology and become a simple, agricultural community full of taboos.  Upper Isis is now a forbidden zone, because, so they believe, the Guardian put a curse on the mountains, imprisoning the people in their own valley.  One boy, Jody N'Kumo, grandson of one of the original settlers, breaks one of the most sacred taboos, and is banished to the land of Guardian, although everyone knows he is simply being sent to his death.  However, Jody does not die, and discovers a place called Bamboo Valley.  There he meets the Lady Olwen, who was the Keeper of the Isis Light in the times before the colony, and learns the truth about the history of Isis.

References

External links

 

1981 British novels
British young adult novels
Canadian young adult novels
1981 science fiction novels
Children's science fiction novels
British science fiction novels
Canadian science fiction novels
Novels by Monica Hughes
Novels set on fictional planets
Hamish Hamilton books